Aberystwyth Castle is a Grade I listed Edwardian fortress located in Aberystwyth, Ceredigion, Mid Wales. It was built in response to the First Welsh War in the late 13th century, replacing an earlier fortress located a mile to the south. During a national uprising by Owain Glyndŵr, the Welsh captured the castle in 1404, but it was recaptured by the English four years later. In 1637 it became a Royal mint by Charles I, and produced silver shillings. The castle was slighted by Oliver Cromwell in 1649.

History
Marcher lord Gilbert de Clare built an earlier Motte and bailey castle a mile south of the current site in around 1110. It was called Tan-y-castell, Aberrheidol Castle and Old Aberystwyth. In 1116 it was sieged by Gruffydd ap Rhys, King of Deheubarth, but his attempt to capture it proved fruitless. He was eventually successful in 1136, capturing it and burning it to the ground with the help of Owain Gwynedd and his brother, Cadwaladr ap Gruffydd, the sons of  Gruffudd ap Cynan, King of Gwynedd, since the Norman invaders had killed their sister, Gwenllian ferch Gruffydd, Gruffydd ap Rhys's wife. Owain Gwynedd gave it to Cadwaladr to rebuild, but Cadwaladr's later attempt to murder Anarawd ap Gruffydd, the new king of Deheubarth, resulted in Owain Gwynedd sending his son Hywel ab Owain Gwynedd to burn it in 1143. The castle was  rebuilt and later reinforced with stone. After a succession of at least three owners, it was taken by Welsh prince Llywelyn the Great in 1221. Llywelyn razed the castle and erected a new one in its place. The current castle was rebuilt in its current location by Edward I of England in 1277 after the end of the first war against Llywelyn ap Gruffydd Llywelyn the Great's grandson. The Welsh took the castle in 1282 at the start of the 1282 war and burned both the castle and the town. Under master mason James of St George, the castle was eventually completed in 1289, though it was sieged extensively during the revolt of Madog ap Llywelyn in 1294–5.

The town of Aberystwyth was flourishing by 1307; its Welsh name was Llanbadarn Gaerog.  However, by the time of the Black Prince in 1343 the castle was in a bad state of disrepair;  the main gateway and drawbridges, the king's hall and long chamber, the kitchen range, and the outer bailey were falling down.

In 1404, Owain Glyndŵr captured and took possession of the castle during a national uprising against English occupation. There would be a treaty signed between Glyndŵr & the King of France at the Castle. Four years later, it was retaken by the English, and became an important seat of the government. In 1637 Charles I turned the castle into a Royal mint, and it became a producer of silver shillings. The mint's operator raised a regiment of Royalist soldiers during the English Civil War. The mint closed down during the Civil War, but served as a warehouse for storing silver and lead. Oliver Cromwell slighted the castle in 1649.

Architecture
Building work started in 1277 at the time of the First Welsh War, the work begun during Edward I's first Welsh campaign at the same time as work started at Flint, Rhuddlan and Builth Wells. The inner ward was built in a diamond-shaped concentric castle, with a twin D-shaped gatehouse keep and mural towers at each corner. The outer ward is described as consisting of a "twin D-shaped gatehouse, a barbican, a rock-cut ditch and a large curtain wall with towers".

See also
Ring of Iron
Castles in Great Britain and Ireland
List of castles in Wales

References

External links 

Castles in Ceredigion
1277 establishments in Europe
Buildings and structures in Aberystwyth
Castle ruins in Wales
Grade I listed castles in Wales
Grade I listed buildings in Ceredigion
13th-century establishments in Wales